"This Is the Day" is a song written by Matt Johnson and originally released as a single by his band The The on 2 September 1983. It reached number 71 in the UK Singles Chart. A version of the song was included on the band's debut album Soul Mining, released in October 1983.

A re-recorded version of the song, re-titled "That Was the Day", was released as the lead track on the Dis-Infected EP in 1993. The EP reached number 17 in the singles chart.

Track listing
7" single
"This Is the Day" – 3:42
"Mental Healing Process" – 3:44

12" single
"This Is the Day" (Extended Version) – 5:22
"I've Been Waitin' for Tomorrow (All of My Life)" (Special Mix) – 7:36

Artwork
The artwork is by Andy Johnson. The font, designed by Fiona Skinner, was also used on the "This is the Day" single artwork. An alternative layout for the  logo was used on this single with the lowercase 'the' larger and set at an angle.

Video
Fiona Skinner directed the promo video for the re-release of 1983 single. The video is a collage of images and memories illustrating Matt Johnson's childhood and Skinner and Johnson's relationship. The single was re-released around the time they split. Skinner created the farewell promo for the song.

Appearances in other media

The song was featured after the opening scene in the 1985 film Static.
The song was featured at the end of the 1995 film Empire Records.
The song features in the final episode of the Channel 4 comedy-drama Fresh Meat.
The song features in the opening scene of the 2018 film I Feel Pretty.
The song was also featured in a sing-along scene and in the house party scene in the 2018 film Every Day.
The song plays during the end of the first episode of season 2 of the HBO show Looking.
The song plays in the background in the ABC show The Good Doctor, season 2 episode 3 "Hubert".
The song plays in the background in the Netflix show Sex Education, season 1 episode 3.
The song plays during the end of the first episode of season 3 of the Fox show 9-1-1.
The song plays in during a scene in the 2019 film Swallow
The song is featured in the 2020 film Love and Monsters 
The song appears in the video game Grand Theft Auto Online , on the radio station Kult FM 99.1
The song plays in the background of the Netflix show Archive 81  in season 1 episode 8.

Personnel 
According to the album sleeve:
 Matt Johnson – synths, instruments, percussion, vocals
 Andy Duncan – Drums
 Paul Boyle – fiddle
 Wix Wickens (credited as "Wicks") – accordion

Charts

That Was the Day

Manic Street Preachers version

In September 2011, "This Is the Day" was covered by Manic Street Preachers as a single to promote their National Treasures – The Complete Singles compilation album. The CD single was only available as a limited edition with the CD/DVD version of National Treasures on the HMV website.

Track listing
Digital download
"This Is the Day" – 3:37
"We Were Never Told" – 3:20

HMV exclusive CD
"This Is the Day" – 3:37
"Rock 'n' Roll Genius" – 2:40

References

1983 songs
1983 singles
The The songs
2011 singles
Manic Street Preachers songs
Epic Records singles